Gabrielle Lutz (4 February 1935 – 3 August 2011) was a French sprint canoeist who competed in the 1960s. She was born in Mulhouse. Lutz competed in the women's K-1 500 m event at the 1960 Summer Olympics in Rome, but was eliminated in the semifinals.

References

Gabrielle Lutz's profile at Sports Reference.com

1935 births
2011 deaths
Canoeists at the 1960 Summer Olympics
French female canoeists
Olympic canoeists of France
Sportspeople from Mulhouse